The 2013–14 Texas–Pan American Broncs men's basketball team represented the University of Texas–Pan American during the 2013–14 NCAA Division I men's basketball season. This was head coach Dan Hipsher's first season at UTPA. The Broncs played their home games at the UTPA Fieldhouse and were new members of the Western Athletic Conference. They finished the season 9–23, 5–11 in WAC play to finish in a three way tie for seventh place. They lost in the quarterfinals of the WAC tournament to Utah Valley.

Roster

Schedule and results

|-
!colspan=9 style="background:#FF6600; color:#006600;"| Exhibition

|-
!colspan=9 style="background:#FF6600; color:#006600;"| Regular season

|-
!colspan=9 style="background:#FF6600; color:#006600;"| WAC tournament

References

UT Rio Grande Valley Vaqueros men's basketball seasons
Texas-Pan American